Adel Messali (born 31 July 1983) is an Algerian footballer. He currently plays for MC El Eulma in the Algerian Ligue Professionnelle 1.

Club career
On 16 June 2008 Messali started for JSM Béjaïa in the final of the 2007–08 Algerian Cup. He played the entire game as JSM Béjaïa won 3-1 in the penalty shootout.

International career
Messali was a member of the Algerian Under-23 National Team in 2003 and 2004. He played at the 2003 All-Africa Games in Nigeria and the qualifiers for the 2004 Summer Olympics.

Honours
 Won the Algerian Cup once with JSM Béjaïa in 2008

References

External links
 DZFoot Profile
 

1983 births
Living people
Algerian footballers
Algerian Ligue Professionnelle 1 players
Footballers from Sétif
ES Sétif players
JSM Béjaïa players
MC El Eulma players
Paradou AC players
Algeria under-23 international footballers
CS Constantine players
Association football defenders
Competitors at the 2003 All-Africa Games
African Games competitors for Algeria
21st-century Algerian people